Podomachla virgo is a moth of the  family Erebidae. It is found on the Comoros, La Réunion and Madagascar.

References

Nyctemerina
Moths described in 1909